Tammy Rivera is an American television personality, singer, fashion designer, and businesswoman. She is a former cast member of the VH1 reality show Love & Hip Hop: Atlanta.

Early life
Rivera met her father Oscar for the first time when she was 14 years old, as he was serving a 30 year prison term.

Career
In 2013, it was announced that Rivera's husband Waka Flocka Flame had joined the cast of the Atlanta franchise of Love & Hip Hop.

In 2015, Rivera started a swimwear line, T-Rivera. The T-Rivera website claims, "The swimwear line features all sizes for women taking a fashion forward approach. Its inspiring designs & patterns are cutting edge, yet constructed to hug all those delicious curves in the right way to beautifully accentuate the female body."

On June 12, 2017, Rivera released her first single "All These Kisses".

March 2020, WETV aired "Waka & Tammy: What The Flocka", as a look into the marriage dynamic between the pop singer & rap star husband Waka Flocka.

Personal life
Rivera married the rapper Waka Flocka Flame on May 25, 2014.

Discography
Extended plays
 Fate (2018)
Albums
 Conversations (2020)

Singles

Filmography

References

External links
 
 

Living people
21st-century American musicians
Participants in American reality television series
People from Warsaw, Virginia
Musicians from Baltimore
American people of Nicaraguan descent
African-American television personalities
20th-century African-American women singers
21st-century American women
21st-century African-American women
21st-century African-American musicians
Year of birth missing (living people)